Brushy Mound Township (T9N R7W) is located in Macoupin County, Illinois, United States. As of the 2010 census, its population was 714 and it contained 357 housing units.

Geography

 Carlinville Township (north)
 Shaws Point Township (northeast)
 Honey Point Township (east)
 Cahokia Township (southeast)
 Gillespie Township (south)
 Hillyard Township (southwest)
 Polk Township (west)
 Bird Township (northwest)

Demographics

References

External links
City-data.com
Illinois State Archives

Townships in Macoupin County, Illinois
Townships in Illinois